Valentina Bassi (born November 13, 1972) is an Argentine film and television actress.

Born in Trelew, Chubut Province, two of the recent films she starred in as the lead, Un Día de suerte (2002) and El Boquete (2006), have been well-received critically.

Filmography
1993: El caso María Soledad
1994: Sin condena (TV Series 1994, 1 episode)
1994: La marca del deseo (TV Series, 13 episodes)
1994: Alta comedia (TV Series 1994, 1 episode)
1994-1995: To Learn to Fly (TV Series, 22 episodes)
1995: The Owner
1996: Wake Up Love
1996-1998:  Verdad consecuencia (TV Series, 130 episodes)
1998: A Crysanthemum Bursts in Cincoesquinas
1998: Marriages
1998: 5 pal peso (Video)
1999: El hombre (TV Mini Series, 13 episodes)
2000: Primicias (TV Series, 37 episodes)
2000: El visitante
2000: Todo x 2 pesos (TV Series, 2 episodes)
2001: Culpables (TV Mini Series, 4 episodes)
2001: La caída del imperio (Short)
2002: Infieles (TV Mini Series, 1 episode)
2002: Every Stewardess Goes to Heaven
2002: Un día de suerte
2001-2002: Final Minute (TV Series, 2 episodes)
2002: Common Ground
2003: Gipsy Love (TV Series 2003, 251 episodes)
2003: Puerto de Partida (Short)
2004: Próxima Salida
2005: Doble vida (TV Series, 98 episodes)
2005: Otra vuelta
2005: Criminal (TV Mini Series, 3 episodes)
2006: El tiempo no para (TV Series,  129 episodes)
2006: El boquete
2007: Televisión por la identidad (TV Mini Series, 1 episode)
2007: 9 mm, crímenes a la medida de la historia (TV Mini Series, 1 episode)
2008: Killer Women (TV Series, 1 episode)
2009: Rodney
2009: Dromo (TV Mini Series, 1 episode)
2010-2011: Un año para recordar (TV Series, 92 episodes)
2011: Historias de la primera vez (TV Mini Series, 1 episode)
2011: Televisión por la inclusión (TV Mini Series, 3 episodes)
2011: Mistreated (TV Mini Series, 2 episodes)
2012: Historia Clinica (TV Mini Series, 1 episode)
2012: Amores de historia (TV Mini Series, 1 episode)
2012: The Clairvoyant's Prayer
2012-2013: Mi amor, mi amor (TV Series, 87 episodes)
2013: Historias de corazón (TV Mini Series, 1 episode)
2013: Historias de diván (TV Mini Series, 1 episode)
2013: Santos y pecadores (TV Mini Series 2013, 1 episode)
2015: El Asesor (TV Mini Series, 2 episodes)
2015: Cromo (TV Series, 4 episodes)
2015: Conflictos modernos (TV Mini Series, 1 episode)
2016: Las Ineses
2017: Libro de la Memoria: Homenaje a las víctimas del atentado (Short)
2017: Al Desierto
2021: I'm a Girl, I'm a Princess

Awards nomination
 Argentine Film Critics Association Awards: Silver Condor; Best Actress, for Un Día de suerte; 2002.

References

External links
 
 

1972 births
Living people
People from Trelew
Argentine people of Italian descent
Argentine film actresses
Argentine television actresses
21st-century Argentine actresses